Cognac Basket Ball is a French professional basketball team located in Cognac, France. The team currently competes in the NM2.

The club is internationally known because some of its players have represented their African national teams at the FIBA Africa Championship.

Notable players
To appear in this section a player must have either:
 Set a club record or won an individual award as a professional player.
 Played at least one official international match for his senior national team or one NBA game at any time.
 Joris Bado 
 Ulysse Dinga
 Hugh Robertson

References

External links
Presentation at Eurobasket.com
Presentation at Facebook

Basketball teams in France
Sports teams in France
Basketball teams established in 1988
1988 establishments in France
Cognac